Bazanaj is a village in Ruin Rural District, in the Central District of Esfarayen County, North Khorasan Province, Iran. Its population was 578, in 143 families at the 2006 census.

References 

Populated places in Esfarayen County